Mitchel Berrenstein (born January 13, 1987 in Waalwijk, Netherlands) is a Dutch former professional basketball player who last played for the Dutch Basketball League club ABC Amsterdam during the 2006-2007 season.

References

External links
 eurobasket.com profile

Dutch men's basketball players
Dutch Basketball League players
Power forwards (basketball)
Amsterdam Basketball players
People from Waalwijk
1987 births
Living people
Sportspeople from North Brabant